A list of American films released in 1999.

American Beauty won the Academy Award for Best Picture.

External links

 
 List of 1999 box office number-one films in the United States
 1999 in American television
 1999 in the United States

1999
Films
Lists of 1999 films by country or language